Palestina de Los Altos is a municipality in the Quetzaltenango department of Guatemala. Its inhabitants speak Mam and Spanish.

Palestina de los Altos was originally called Toj Suj.  It is located between San Juan Ostuncalco and San Marcos.

The land is mainly used for farming, primarily corn and potatoes, and pasture.

Organization
Township

 Nueva Linda
 El Socorro
 Los Gonzáles
 Los Méndez
 Los Peñalonzo
 Roble Grande
 El Campo
 Alta Mira
 Los López
 Los Díaz
 Los Cabrera
 La Feria
 Los Morales
 Los Molinos

Hamlet El Carmen

 Los Miranda
 La Joya
 Nuevo Palmira
 El Centro del Carmen
 Toj Wabill
 El Carmen II
 El Toj Pic

Hamlet San José Buena Vista

 Los González
 Los Marroquín
 La Cumbre
 El Centro de San José Buena Vista
 Los Gómez
 Los Pérez
 Cruz Verde
 Toj Choll (Cruz del Mexicano)

Hamlet El Edén

 Mira Peña
 Las Delicias
 Buenos Aires
 Centro del Edén
 El Sinaí
 Los Desiertos
 Los Laureles
 Cantón Barrios

Climate
Palestina de los Altos has a cold subtropical highland climate (Cwb) with dry winters and rainy summers.

References

Municipalities of the Quetzaltenango Department